"Scar Tissue" is the first single from American rock band Red Hot Chili Peppers' seventh studio album, Californication (1999). Released on May 25, 1999, the song spent a then-record 16 consecutive weeks atop the US Billboard Hot Modern Rock Tracks chart as well as 10 weeks atop the Billboard Mainstream Rock Tracks chart, and it reached number nine on the Billboard Hot 100. It was also successful in Iceland, New Zealand, and Canada, reaching numbers one, three, and four, respectively. In the United Kingdom, it charted at number 15 on the UK Singles Chart.

"Scar Tissue" is considered to be representative of the new, more melodic rock sound the band experimented with on Californication (in contrast with the psychedelic One Hot Minute, and dry funk of Blood Sugar Sex Magik). The song is notable for its mellow intro guitar riff and for its slide guitar solos throughout. Guitar World placed the guitar solo 63rd in its list of the "100 Greatest Guitar Solos". "Scar Tissue" won a Grammy Award for Best Rock Song in 2000.

In 2004, Anthony Kiedis published an autobiography titled after the song. Co-written by Larry Sloman, its principal theme was sex, drugs and rock-'n-roll. In the book he talks about the consequences of drugs (especially heroin) and how this can destroy a person's life.

Music video
The music video for "Scar Tissue" was directed by Stéphane Sednaoui, who also directed the video for "Give It Away".

The opening shot is of John Frusciante driving down a strip of desert highway, a metaphor for Frusciante's return to the band (he does not drive in real life). But the four of them are battered, beaten and bandaged. They are traveling in a rusty wreck and playing broken instruments on the comeback trail. The video ends after an emotional thirty second Frusciante guitar solo at the moment of sunset, with John tossing the broken, stringless guitar from the car. The car Frusciante pretended to drive for the video was a 1967 Pontiac Catalina convertible. A very similar concept was considered, then scrapped, for the earlier "Soul to Squeeze" video. Prior to the video shoot, Kiedis had his hair cut and bleached his brown hair to platinum blond, a look he kept throughout the promotion and tour for Californication. It was filmed in California's Mojave Desert.

Live performances
"Scar Tissue" has been a live staple in the band's setlists since its first performance in 1998 making it the band's fifth most performed song overall.

The band Mr. Bungle performed a mock version of the song in 1999, as part of a halloween concert parodying Red Hot Chili Peppers.

Personnel
Red Hot Chili Peppers
 Anthony Kiedis – lead vocals
 John Frusciante – slide and rhythm guitar, backing vocals
 Flea – bass, backing vocals
 Chad Smith – drums, shaker

Track listings
CD single (1999) (Catalogue Number 9 16913-2)
 "Scar Tissue" (album) – 3:37
 "Gong Li" (previously unreleased) – 3:42
 "Instrumental #1" (previously unreleased) – 2:48

CD single (Slipcase) (1999)
 "Scar Tissue" (album) – 3:37
 "Gong Li" (previously unreleased) – 3:42

Cassette single (1999)
 "Scar Tissue" (album)
 "Gong Li" (previously unreleased)

Charts

Weekly charts

Year-end charts

Certifications

Release history

See also
 List of number-one mainstream rock hits (United States)
 Number one modern rock hits of 1999
 List of RPM Rock/Alternative number-one singles

References

1999 singles
1999 songs
Grammy Award for Best Rock Song
Music videos directed by Stéphane Sednaoui
Number-one singles in Iceland
Red Hot Chili Peppers songs
Song recordings produced by Rick Rubin
Songs written by Anthony Kiedis
Songs written by Chad Smith
Songs written by Flea (musician)
Songs written by John Frusciante
Warner Records singles